Odonticium is a genus of fungi belonging to the family Rickenellaceae.

The genus was first described by Erast Parmasto in 1968.

The genus has cosmopolitan distribution.

Species:
 Odonticium romellii (S.Lundell) Parmasto

References

Hymenochaetales
Agaricomycetes genera